This is a list of Buddhist temples, monasteries, stupas, and pagodas in Sri Lanka for which there are Wikipedia articles, sorted by location.

Central Province

Kandy District

 Araththana Purana Tampita Rajamaha Viharaya, Daulagala
 Asgiri Maha Viharaya, Kandy
 Dankumbura Tampita Viharaya, Hataraliyadda
 Danture Raja Maha Viharaya, Pilimathalawa
 Degaldoruwa Raja Maha Vihara, Kundasale
 Devanapatissa Vipassana International Meditation Centre, Kandy
 Divurum Bodhi Viharaya, Kandy
 Doragamuwa Shailapabbatharama Tampita Viharaya, Wattegama
 Gadaladeniya Vihara, Pilimatalawa
 Gangarama Rajamaha Viharaya, Lewella
 Galmaduwa Viharaya, Kundasale
 Gondeniya Purana Tampita Viharaya, Kadugannawa
 Hendeniya Rajamaha Viharaya, Mampitiya
 Hindagala Rajamaha Viharaya, Hindagala
 Katapitiya Purana Tampita Viharaya, Pilimathalawa
 Lankatilaka Vihara, Pilimatalawa
 Malwathu Maha Viharaya, Kandy
 Sri Maha Bodhi Viharaya, Kandy
 Temple of the Tooth [Sri Dalada Maligawa], Kandy
 Mahamewnawa Buddhist Monastery,Kundasale

Matale District

 Ambilla Rajamaha Viharaya, Matale
 Aluvihare Rock Temple, Matale
 Awariyapathaha Rajamaha Viharaya, Galewela
 Bambawa Purana Rajamaha Viharaya, Galewela
 Dambulla cave temple, Dambulla
 Dambulla Somawathie Stupa, Dambulla
 Dembawa Purana Tampita Viharaya, Galewela
 Gurubebila Purana Tampita Viharaya, Matihaththa
 Nalanda Gedige, Naula
 Pidurangala Vihara, Pidurangala

Nuwara Eliya District
 Araththana Rajamaha Viharaya, Hanguranketha
 Kadadora Vihara, Kotmale
 Kotmale Mahaweli Maha Seya, Kotmale
 Pothgulmaliga Rajamaha Viharaya, Hanguranketha
 Pusulpitiya Raja Maha Vihara, Kotmale

Eastern Province

Ampara District
 Ekgaloya Aloka Rajamaha Viharaya, Damana
 Bakmeedaeniya Purana Viharaya, Dehiattakandiya
 Bambaragasthalawa Naga Pabbatha Viharaya, Kumana
 Bowattegala Forest Monastery, Kumana
 Buddhangala Forest Monastery, Ampara
 Deegamadutu Stupa, Akkaraipattu
 Deeghawapi, Ninthavur
 Diviyagala Forest Hermitage, Damana
 Galmaduwa Raja Maha Vihara, Ampara
 Gonagolla Vihara, Gonagolla
 Hagirigolla Kota Vehera, Hingurana
 Harasgala Gallen Viharaya, Mahaoya
 Henanigala Rajamaha Viharaya, Dehiattakandiya
 Henennanegala Rajamaha Viharaya, Mahaoya
 Holike Kollegama Rajamaha Viharaya, Padiyathalawa
 Hulannuge Tharulengala Rajamaha Viharaya, Lahugala
 Hungamalagama Sri Jayasundararama Purana Viharaya, Dehiattakandiya
 Lahugala Kiri Vehera, Lahugala
 Lahugala Kota Vehera, Lahugala
 Magul Maha Viharaya, Lahugala
 Mottagala Gamini Tissa Monastery, Akkaraipattu
 Muhudu Maha Viharaya, Pottuvil
 Muwangala Raja Maha Vihara, Hingurana
 Neelagiriseya, Lahugala
 Ovagiriya, Polwatta
 Padiyadora Raja Maha Vihara, Padiyathalawa
 Peace Pagoda, Ampara
 Piyangala Aranya Senasanaya, Mahaoya
 Rassagala, Bakkiella
 Samanabedda cave temple, Uhana
 Samanalatenna Hermitage, Dehiattakandiya
 Samangala Aranya Senasanaya, Mahaoya
 Sri Dharmendrarama Raja Maha Vihara, Gonagolla
 Tampitiya Rajamaha Viharaya, Mahaoya
 Udayagiri Raja Maha Vihara, Uhana
 Uththara Jayamaha Vihara, Hingurana

Batticoloa District
Jayanthi Buddhist Center, Batticaloa
Pancha Maha Viharaya, Valaichchenai
Punyayaramaya, Eravur
Pulinathalaramaya, Chenkalady
Buddha Jayanthi Temple, Valaichchenai
Bodhirajaramaya, Chenkalady
Mangalarama Temple, Batticaloa
Mahindaramaya, Valaichchenai
Sri Abhinavaramaya, Keviliyamaduwa
Sri Vivekaramaya, Kalkudah

Trincomalee District
 Agbopura Forest Hermitage, Kantalai
 Anandakulama Tissa Forest Monastery, Trincomalee
 Arisimale Rajamaha Viharaya, Pulmudai
 Girihandu Seya
 Gokanna Vihara, Trincomalee
 Kiulekadavala Shailabimbarama Purana Viharaya, Adampanei
 Lankapatuna Samudragiri Viharaya
 Seruvila Mangala Raja Maha Viharaya
 Velgam Vehera
 Villgamvehera Raja Maha Vihara, Villgamvehera, Seruvila

Northern Province

Jaffna District
 Ancient Kadurugoda Viharaya, Chunnakam
 Buddha Walawwa Rajamaha Viharaya, Nagadeepa
 Dambakola Patuna Sangamiththa Temple, Chulipuram
 Nagadeepa Purana Viharaya, Nagadeepa
 Samiddi Sumuna Viharaya, Chavakachcheri
 Sri Naga Viharaya, Jaffna
 Tissa Maha Viharaya, Kankesanthurai

Kilinochchi District
 Lumbini Viharaya, Kilinochchi

Mannar District
 Anuradharamaya, Mannar
 Maninaga Viharaya, Mannar
 Mathota Rajamaha Viharaya, Manthai
 Murunkan Raja Maha Viharaya, Mannar
 Sri Bodhiraja Viharaya, Madhuroad
 Sri Vijayathilaka Viharaya, Silavathura
 Swarnabimbaramaya, Madhuroad
 Valukaramaya, Talaimannar

Mullaitivu District
 Pansal Kanda Purana Viharaya
 Gurukanda Raja Maha Viharaya

Vavuniya District
 Karagamkulam Monastery, Settikulam
 Galnaddumkulama Viharaya
 Madukanda Viharaya
 Navagama Kiri Vehera

North Central Province

Anuradhapura District

 Abhayagiriya
 Ambarali Tampita Rajamaha Viharaya, Andiyagala
 Andigala Rajamaha Viharaya, Rajanganaya
 Anuradhapura Maha Viharaya
 Atamasthana
 Avukana Buddha Statue
 Billewa Barathanaga Cave Hermitage, Thanthirimale
 Budugehinna Rajamaha Viharaya, Andiyagala
 Chandrasara Forest Hermitage, Halmillewa
 Dakkhina Stupa
 Doramadalawa Rajamaha Viharaya, Rambewa
 Ethwehera Stupa, Mihintale
 Galpaya Purana Rajamaha Viharaya, Andiyagala
 Giribanda Stupa, Mihintale
 Habarana Tampita Rajamaha Viharaya, Habarana
 Hallmillawetiya Kalagam Vehera, Kebithigollewa
 Handagalakanda Len Viharya, Rathmalgahawewa
 Hiriwadunna Sri Bodhiraja Forest Hermitage, Habarana
 Isurumuniya  
 Jetavanarama
 Kiribath Vehera
 Lankarama
 Lovamahapaya
 Mayura Pirivena
 Mihintale Rajamaha Viharaya, Mihintale
 Mirisaveti Stupa
 Naka Vihara
 Ritigala Buddhist Monastery, Ritigala
 Ruwanwelisaya
 Samadhi Statue
 Sandahiru Seya
 Sela Cetiya
 Sri Maha Bodhiya
 Sri Wanasinghe Rajamaha Viharaya, Galkiriyagama
  Thanthirimale Raja Maha Viharaya, Thanthirimale
 Thuparamaya
 Vessagiri
 Walahaviddawewa Kuda Dambulla Raja Maha Viharaya, Horowpathana

Polonnaruwa District
 Demala Maha Seya, Polonnaruwa
 Dimbulagala Raja Maha Vihara, Dimbulagala
 Gal Vihara, Polonnaruwa
 Hatadage, Polonnaruwa
 Medirigiriya Vatadage, Medirigiriya
 Polonnaruwa Vatadage, Polonnaruwa
 Rankoth Vehera, Polonnaruwa
 Somawathiya Stupa, Polonnaruwa
 Unagalawehera Rajamaha Viharaya, Hingurakgoda

North Western Province

Kurunegala District
 
 Ahugoda Purana Tampita Viharaya, Pothuhera
 Algama Sri Sangharaja Maha Viharaya, Pothuhera
 Algamakanda Purana Len Viharaya, Pothuhera
 Aluth Herathgama Upatissarama Tampita Viharaya, Galgamuwa
 Amunukule Sri Wardhanarama Tampita Viharaya, Kobeigane
 Arankale Forest Monastery, Malsiripura
 Aulegama Beyawa Tampita Rajamaha Viharaya, Padeniya
 Badagamuwa Thorayaya Purana Tampita Viharaya, Kurunegala
 Balalla Dimbulgiri Tampita Viharaya, Daladagama
 Bihalpola Tampita Rajamaha Viharaya, Nakkawatta
 Budhumuttawa Tampita Rajamaha Viharaya, Nikaweratiya
 Bulnewa Tampita Rajamaha Viharaya, Polpithigama
 Bulupitiya Sri Sughatharama Purana Viharaya, Uhumeeya
 Dalukgolla Sri Purwarama Rajamaha Viharaya, Nikaweratiya
 Dandagamuwa Sri Sudharmarama Tampita Viharaya, Kuliyapitiya
 Deekirikewa Purana Tampita Viharaya, Dambadeniya
 Deethawa Sri Mahamuni Tampita Viharaya, Narammala
 Dehannagama Sri Sudharshanarama Tampita Viharaya, Nikaweratiya
 Detiyamulla Sri Jetthatissa Rajamaha Viharaya, Panduwasnuwara
 Devagiri Rajamaha Viharaya, Bingiriya
 Digampitiya Purana Tampita Viharaya, Kurunegala
 Diyabate Purana Viharaya, Yapahuwa
 Dorabavila Sri Sugatharama Tampita Viharaya, Kurunegala
 Edandawala Purana Tampita Viharya, Kurunegala
 Ethanawatta Meddegoda Purana Tampita Viharaya, Bamunakotuwa
 Galgamuwa Purana Tampita Viharaya, Dambadeniya
 Ganangamuwa Sri Purvarama Purana Tampita Viharaya, Nakkawatta
 Ganewewa Purana Viharya, Nikaweratiya
 Ginihiriya Sri Sudharshana Tampita Viharaya, Dodamgaslanda
 Halmbagala Rajamaha Viharaya, Nikaweratiya 
 Hatthikucchi Viharaya, Mahagalkadawala
 Hindagahawewa Wadaungala Purana Tampita Viharya, Panduwasnuwara
 Hindawa Sri WijeSundararama Purana Tampita Viharaya, Bamunakotuwa
 Hiripathwela Mayurawathie Sri Bodhirajarama Purana Tampita Viharaya, Wadakada
 Hiruwalpola Sri Pushparama Tampita Viharaya, Bingiriya
 Horawadunna Sri Sudharsha Shailabimbarama Tampita Viharaya, Pannala
 Hulugala Tampita Viharaya, Nikaweratiya
 Humbuluwa Rajamaha Viharaya, Alawwa
 Ibbagala Raja Maha Vihara
 Mahamevnawa Buddhist Monastery, Polgahawela
 Na Uyana Aranya
 Nikasala Aranya Senasanaya
 Panduwasnuwara Raja Maha Vihara, Panduwasnuwara
 Paramaulla Purana Tampita Viharaya, Alawwa
 Reswehera
 Ridi Viharaya, Rideegama
 Shrastravinda Piriven Raja Maha Viharaya, Gokarella
 Sri Bodhirukkharama Purana Tampita Viharaya, Pothuhera
 Sri Wijayasundararamaya, Dambadeniya
 Waduwawa Bambaragala Rajamaha Viharaya, Polgahawela
 Hiriwewa Sri Jayasumanaramaya , Kobeigane

Puttalam District
 Dikwela Sri Vishuddharama Purana Tampita Viharaya, Dankotuwa
 Galge Viharaya, Wilpaththu
 Malwila Raja Maha Vihara, Vanatavilluwa
 Mulgirigala Raja Maha Vihara, Navagattegama
 Paramakanda Raja Maha Vihara, Anamaduwa
 Senanayake Aramaya, Madampe
 Suvisuddharamaya, Manakkulama

Sabaragamuwa Province

Ratnapura District
 Abhayathilakarathnaramaya, Kuruwita
 Adam's Peak
 Aramanapola Raja Maha Vihara, Pelmadulla
 Batatotalena Cave Vihara, Kuruwita
 Beligala Rajamaha Viharaya, Balangoda
 Bodhimaluwa Sri Nagabodhi Rajamaha Viharaya, Parakaduwa
 Budulena Rajamaha Viharaya, Palmadulla
 Dapane Sri Jayasumana Rajamaha Viharaya, Urubokka
 Delgamuwa Raja Maha Vihara, Kuruwita
 Elugala Tampita Viharaya, Balangoda
 Gatabaruwa Rajamaha Viharaya, Ratnapura
 Kuragala
 Sri Mahinda Purana Tampita Rajamaha Viharaya, Godakawela

Kegalle District

 Alkegama Sri Jayawardhanarama Tampita Viharaya, Makehelwala
 Ambulugala Sri Danthapaya Rajamaha Viharaya, Mawanella
 Arambegama Sri Sudassanarama Purana Tampita Viharaya, Rambukkana
 Asmadala Purana Tampita Viharaya, Ussapitiya
 Attanagoda Sri Vishuddharama Tampita Viharaya, Mawanella
 Beligala Sri Wijaya Sundararama Viharaya, Kegalle
 Beligammana Raja Maha Vihara, Mawanella
 Burunnewa Sri Nagarukkharama Tampita Rajamaha Viharaya, Nelumdeniya
 Danakirigala Rajamaha Viharaya, Mawanella
 Dadigama Kota Wehera, Nelumdeniya
 Deliwala Kota Wehera, Rambukkana
 Dewanagala Rajamaha Viharaya, Mawanella
 Diyasunantha Kirthi Sri Rajasinghe Tampita Rajamaha Viharaya, Rambukkana
 Dodanthale Raja Maha Vihara, Mawanella
 Eraminigammana Sri Susilarama Tampita Viharaya, Hemmathagama
 Gammanagoda Sri Sudharshanarama Tampita Viharaya, Ussapitiya
 Gondiwela Purana Tampita Viharaya, Mawanella
 Hingula Tampita Viharaya, Mawanella
 Holombuwa Sthripura Rajamaha Viharaya, Thuntota
 Mediliya Purana Tampita Viharaya, Hemmathagama

Southern Province

Galle District
 Bemwehera Gane Rajamaha Viharaya, Bentota
 Bodhimalu Rajamaha Viharaya, Bentota
 Galapatha Rajamaha Viharaya, Bentota
 Galwehera Maluwa Rajamaha Viharaya, Ahungalla
 Island Hermitage
 Kothduwa temple, Maduganga River
 Pilana Raja Maha Vihara
 Sri Pushparama Vihara, Balapitiya
 Sunandarama Vihara
 Wanawasa Rajamaha Viharaya, Bentota

Matara District
 Agalakada Dharmarakshitha Purana Viharaya, Akuressa
 Dampahala Vilayaya Purana Tampita Viharaya, Urubokka
 Devinuwara Rajamaha Viharaya, Dondra
 Elamaldeniya Rajamaha Viharaya, Pitabeddara
 Matara Bodhiya, Matara

Hambantota District
 Anjaligala Rajamaha Viharaya, Tissamaharama
 Bandagiriya Rajamaha Viharaya, Hambantota
 Dalada Viharaya, Kirinda
 Ethugalpawa Akasa Chetiya, Yaala
 Galenda Rajamaha Viharaya, Ambalantota
 Gangarama Rajamaha Viharaya, Ambalantota
 Girihandu Rajamaha Viharaya, Ambalantota
 Gothapabbatha Rajamaha Viharaya, Ambalantota
 Hakuruwela Peelawela Purana Rajamaha Viharaya, Weeraketiya
 Hathagala Purana Tampita Viharaya, Hungama
 Kasagala Raja Maha Vihara, Angunakolapelassa
 Menik Rajamaha Viharaya, Debarawewa
 Mulkirigala Raja Maha Vihara, Mulkirigala
 Naigala Raja Maha Vihara, Weeraketiya
 Pachchimarama Rajamaha Viharaya, Debarawewa
 Sithulpawwa Rajamaha Viharaya, Kataragama
 Tissamaharama Raja Maha Vihara, Tissamaharama
 Yatala Vehera, Tissamaharama

Uva Province

Badulla District

 Alakolagoda Purana Viharaya, Meegahakivula
 Ampitiya Rajamaha Viharaya, Kanawaralla
 Dankumbura Purana Gallen Rajamaha Viharaya, Akiriyankumbura
 Dhowa rock temple, Bandarawela
 Mahiyangana Raja Maha Vihara, Mahiyangana
 Muthiyangana Raja Maha Vihara, Badulla

Monaragala District

 Alugalge Lena Forest Hermitage, Maligawila
 Alutwela Thibbatuwawa Purana Tampita Viharaya, Buttala
 Alutwewa Kota Vehera, Hambegamuwa
 Bibilemulla Rajamaha Viharaya, Monaragala
 Buddama Raja Maha Vihara, Siyambalanduwa
 Budugallena Forest Hermitage, Buttala
 Buduruwagala Rajamaha Vihara, Wellawaya
 Dambagalla Bingoda Rajamaha Viharaya, Madulla
 Dewram Vehera Purana Rajamaha Viharaya, Thanamalvila
 Dematamal Viharaya, Okkampitiya
 Endagala Forest Hermitage, Thanamalvila
 Gonaganara Valagamba Purana Viharaya, Buttala
 Gopalapabbata Rajamaha Viharaya, Thanamalvila
 Gopalapabbatha Rajamaha Viharaya, Thanamalvila
 Happoruwa Purana Viharaya, Buttala
 Helamulla Degalhela Purana Viharaya, Siyambalanduwa
 Kanabiso Pokuna Raja Maha Vihara, Handapanagala
 Katugalge Rajamaha Viharaya, Buttala
 Keheliya Raja Maha Vihara, Handapanagala
 Kiri Vehera, Kataragama
 Kokunnewa Purana Tampita Viharaya, Bibile
 Maligawila Buddha statue, Maligawila
 Unawatuna Rajamaha Viharaya, Buttala
 Veheragoda Purana Rajamaha Viharaya, Badalkumbura
 Yatiyallatota Kutumbala Rajamaha Viharaya, Buttala

Western Province

Colombo District
 Vietnam Buddhist Temple in Sri Lanka (85/8 Pagoda Road, Nugegoda, Sri Lanka)
 Ambulgama Raja Maha Vihara, Hanwella
 Balapokuna Raja Maha Vihara, Pamankada
 Bellanwila Viharaya, Bellanwila
 Buddhist Cultural Centre, Dehiwala
 Gangaramaya Temple, Colombo
 Deepaduttaramaya, Kotahena
 Isipathanaramaya Temple, Havelock Town
 Kotte Raja Maha Vihara, Sri Jayawardenepura Kotte
 Kshetrarama Maha Vihara, Moratuwa
 Sambodhi Chaithya, Colombo Harbour
 Samudrasanna Vihara, Mount-Lavinia
 Seema Malaka, Beira Lake
 Siri Perakumba Pirivena, Sri Jayawardenepura Kotte
 Sri Pushparama Vihara, Ratmalana
 Sri Subodharama Raja Maha Vihara, Dehiwala
 Maligawatta Purana Raja Maha Vihara, Attidiya

Gampaha District
 Alawala Purana Pothgul Len Rajamaha Viharaya, Attanagalla
 Anuragoda Sri Sumangala Purana Tampita Viharaya, Pepiliyawala
 Aluthepola Ganekanda Raja Maha Vihara, Minuwangoda
 Asgiriya Raja Maha Vihara, Gampaha
 Attanagalla Rajamaha Viharaya, Attanagalla
 Atupothdeniya Pothgul Rajamaha Viharaya, Mirigama
 Bodhirajaramaya, Negombo
 Ganewatta Purana Bodhimalu Tampita Viharaya, Divulapitiya
 Giri Sri Darshanarama Purana tampita Viharaya, Kirindiwela
 Hapuwalana Kshethrarama Purana Tampita Viharaya, Divulapitiya
 Kelaniya Raja Maha Vihara
 Koskandawala Raja Maha Vihara
 Maligatenna Raja Maha Vihara
 Nissarana Vanaya
 Panasawanarama Purana Vihara
 Pilikuththuwa Raja Maha Vihara
 Sri Saddharmagupta Piriven Vihara
 Uruwala Valagamba Raja Maha Vihara
 Uththararama Purana Vihara, Udugampola
 Warana Raja Maha Vihara
 Yatawatte Purana Vihara

Kalutara District
 Asokaramaya Buddhist Temple, Kalutara
 Bodhinagala Forest Hermitage, Ingiriya
 Ganeuda Rajamaha Viharaya, Warakagoda
 Kalutara Bodhiya, Kalutara
 Kande Vihara, Aluthgama

See also
 Architecture of Sri Lanka
 Buddhism in Sri Lanka
 List of Buddhist temples

Notes

External links

 BuddhaNet's Comprehensive Directory of Buddhist Temples sorted by country
 Buddhactivity Dharma Centres database

 
 
Sri Lanka
Buddhist temples